Leopoldo Jorge Méndez Alcayaga (born 21 July 1975 in Valparaíso) is a Chilean-Swedish DJ, singer and producer, known by his stage name Méndez, formerly DJ Méndez. He won the 2002 MTV Video Music Awards Latinoamérica for Best Southwest New Artist.

Early life
His father was a political dissident, who left Chile after the Chilean regime began monitoring him. In 1986, Méndez, his two brothers and mother left for Sweden; they lived at various places before settling down in the suburb of Farsta in Stockholm. He went to school in the Larsbodaskolan, in Farsta Strand, joined a gang and was a small-time criminal, though he always had the goal of making it in showbusiness. After several run-ins with the police, he focused on beginning his career.

Career
After joining a counseling institution called Fasta and meeting sound engineer Jordi Fuste, DJ Méndez started his career as a Latin rapper, making his live debut in a local festival. Mixing hip-hop and traditional Latin American rhythms, he was able to get a record deal, soon climbing charts in Sweden, Norway, Denmark, Finland, and even Russia with his first hit "Chiki-Chiki", featured in his debut album Latino for Life. He had met producer Robert Wåtz while working at Toys R Us. The emerging interest for Latin American music in Europe was one factor in the acceptance of his music. Some of his songs like "Estocolmo" feature the attitude and opinion of Latin American immigrants to Scandinavian countries.

His songs are in Chilean Spanish with a mixture of English, produced in conjunction with DJ Rob'n'Raz, have melodic choruses by singers such as Emmanuel Contreras, Martin Thors, Pablo Javier Gonzalez Cepeda (better known as Yei) who were both in their studio recordings and in live performances.

He is one of the best representatives of Chilean rap and hip-hop and one of the Chilean artists with greater international influence. He won an MTV Video Music Award Latinoamérica and an MTV Europe Music Awards. He was runner-up in the Melodifestivalen Sweden 2002, he won a Golden Gull at the Festival of Viña del Mar, has taken part in Son Latino Festivals in the Canary Islands, Spain with 350,000 people attending, has performed at a concert for more than 250,000 people in the Red Square of Moscow, Russia, and sung for more than 100,000 people at the Pampilla Festival in Coquimbo. In March 2001 he visited his native country, carrying out a successful promotional tour.

In 2009, Méndez released the single "Lady" in October and the album "210" in December. In 2012, he released "Playing with fire" a Top 40 single en Chile. He sang the anthem for the 2012 Teletón. In 2013, he sang the main theme of Chilean soap opera "Dos por uno", a song called "Me estoy volviendo loco". He was also a judge in TV impersonators show "Tu cara me suena". That year he starred in TV reality show "Los Méndez", about his family life.

In 2013, he performed at Chilean festivals Viva Dichato and Festival de Antofagasta. In 2015 he sang the official songs for the two football tournaments held that year in Chile, the 2015 Copa América and the 2015 FIFA U-17 World Cup. In January 2017 he took part in reality show "Doble tentación" with his partner Marcela Duque. He currently manages his own label, Macabro Records, where he supports young emerging musicians, and together with his brother, DJ eMe, manages the largest DJ school in Scandinavia, Macabro DJ School.

He participated in Let's Dance 2019, which was broadcast on TV4.

In 2020, he participated in Melodifestivalen 2020, collaborating with Alvaro Estrella and entering the song Vamos Amigos. They qualified to the final, and finished 11th out of 12 entries on 7 March 2020.

Personal life
Méndez met his former wife Ninoska Espinoza, also Chilean-born, as a teenager. Together they have three children. He is Roman Catholic, and has a tattoo of Jesus Christ, among others. Later in life he met Marcela Duque and together they have one child, he also has 2 other children with another woman. In total, Méndez has six children.

In 2016, he ran for mayor of Valparaiso as an independent candidate representing the New Majority coalition, but did not win the November election.

Discography

Studio albums

Compilation albums

Singles

Awards and nominations

References

1975 births
Living people
21st-century Chilean male singers
Chilean pop singers
Chilean singer-songwriters
Chilean DJs
Hip hop singers
Musicians from Valparaíso
Singers from Valparaíso
Chilean expatriates in Sweden
Swedish rappers
Spanish-language singers of Sweden
Swedish people of Chilean descent
Melodifestivalen contestants of 2020
Melodifestivalen contestants of 2018
Melodifestivalen contestants of 2003
Melodifestivalen contestants of 2002